Patricius lucifer is a  butterfly found in the  East Palearctic (South Siberia (mountains), Kazakhstan, Mongolia, West China) that belongs to the blues family.

Taxonomy
Patricius lucifer used to be placed in the genus Plebejus.

Description from Seitz

L. lucifera Stgr. (= biton Brem.) (78 g). Above both sexes blackish, the male with the scaling on the disc quite dark blue-green with vivid gloss ; the female before the margin of the hindwing with pale ocelli whose centres are formed by the marginal dots. Beneath very uniformly deep dark grey, the ocelli with pale borders, the anal ones with metallic scales. Siberia (Altai), Mongolia and Tibet. — themis Gr.-Grsh.[now full species] is similar to eversmanni, with smaller and paler ocelli on the underside; from the Sinin Mountains.

See also
List of butterflies of Russia

References

Polyommatini